A Daughter of Australia may refer to:

 A Daughter of Australia (1912 film), a 1912 Australian silent film directed by Gaston Mervale
 A Daughter of Australia (1922 film), a 1922 Australian silent film directed by Lawson Harris